Residual property may refer to:

 Residual property (mathematics), a property of groups
 Residual property (physics), a thermodynamic term

it:Grandezze residue